Lansing Station is a road located in Lansing, New York, United States. It is on the eastern shore of Cayuga Lake in the Finger Lakes region of Upstate New York and is often used to refer to a part of the town located in the Lansing School District near the North Lansing Fire Station.

There is mixed residential housing along Lansing Station, which is also home to The Ridge (formerly Cecil's Tavern), one of the few bars in the town.

The neighborhood is a community or populated place (Class Code U6) located in Tompkins County at latitude 42.577 and longitude -76.609 with an elevation of 404 feet. Lansing Station appears on the Ludlowville U.S. Geological Survey Map. Tompkins County is in the Eastern Time Zone (UTC−5).

References

 Tompkins County, New York